Frome Sports Club is a multi-use stadium in Frome near Savanna-la-Mar, Jamaica.  It is currently used mostly for football matches. It serves as a home ground of Reno FC.  The stadium holds 2,000 people.

References

Football venues in Jamaica
Buildings and structures in Westmoreland Parish